El Chocón may refer to:
 El Chocón Dam, in Neuquén Province, Argentina
 Villa El Chocón, a city in Neuquén, Argentina